Anas Sarwar (born 14 March 1983) is a Scottish politician who has served as leader of the Scottish Labour Party since 2021. He has been a Member of the Scottish Parliament (MSP) for the Glasgow region since 2016. He served as the Member of Parliament (MP) for Glasgow Central from 2010 to 2015. During his time in the House of Commons, he served as deputy leader of the Scottish Labour Party from 2011 to 2014.

Sarwar lost his seat to the Scottish National Party (SNP) at the 2015 general election. He was elected at the 2016 Scottish Parliament election on the Glasgow regional list. He unsuccessfully contested the 2017 Scottish Labour leadership election, but was elected as leader of the Scottish Labour Party in the party's 2021 leadership election and led Scottish Labour into the 2021 Scottish Parliament election.

Early life and career 
Anas Sarwar was born on 14 March 1983 in Glasgow, the youngest of four children. His parents were Perveen Sarwar and Mohammad Sarwar, both Pakistani Muslims. He attended Hutchesons' Grammar School, a private school in Glasgow, before completing a degree in general dentistry at the University of Glasgow from 2000 to 2005. While a student, he joined marches against the Iraq War. He worked as an NHS dentist in Paisley from 2005 until 2009.

Early political career 
Sarwar began campaigning for the Labour Party as a child of "nine or ten" and joined the party at the age of fifteen or sixteen. His father was elected as the Labour MP for Glasgow Govan in 1997, becoming the UK's first Muslim MP. In that year, Sarwar received an envelope containing a threat against his mother. Sarwar served as an executive member of Scottish Young Labour and later joined the Co-operative Party, a party which stands candidates jointly with the Labour Party, as well as the Fabian Society, the trades unions Unite and Community, and the pressure group Progress. He served as vice-chair of Progress in 2011.

Sarwar was selected as the lead regional list candidate for the Glasgow Scottish Parliament electoral region for the 2007 election. He was a member of Labour's Scottish Policy Forum which was responsible for drawing-up the Scottish Labour Party manifesto for that election. He was not elected, later saying that standing as a list candidate had been a chance "to prove himself", and that he had had "no chance" of success given his party's success in winning constituency seats under the additional member system.

Member of Parliament 
Sarwar's father announced his retirement as the MP for Glasgow Central in February 2007. Later that year, Sarwar was selected as the Labour candidate for the seat in the 2010 United Kingdom general election. He emphasised his independence and differentiated himself from his father's politics. The Guardian described him as positioning himself on the "moderate left" of the Labour Party, supporting electoral reform for the House of Commons, reforming the House of Lords to have a majority of elected seats but with some seats remaining appointed, and reducing the scale of the UK's nuclear deterrant. He opposed privatisation of the NHS but supported the use of private finance initiative schemes to build schools. He won the election with 52.0% of the vote, an increase on the previous voteshare and majority.

He was elected by colleagues to serve on the International Development Select Committee. He said that his parliamentary interests included foreign policy and international development, and that he wanted to "use his parliamentary platform to make a difference on" conflicts in Palestine and Kashmir. In December 2011, Sarwar was elected as deputy Leader of the Scottish Labour Party receiving 51.1% of the vote. In January 2013, he was awarded the politician of the year award at the British Muslim Awards. In 2013, Sarwar took a strong line in attacking both the "bedroom tax" and accused the Scottish Government of failure to mitigate its worst effects. During a vote on its repeal, Sarwar was in Pakistan, giving a speech to students at Hajvery University, and so was paired with a Conservative MP, cancelling out the two votes. He was criticised for his absence by the Scottish National Party (SNP). In 2014, Sarwar was criticised by SNP politicians for sending his son to Hutchesons' Grammar School, a private school and the same school that he himself attended, instead of a state school.

From November 2014 until May 2015, Sarwar served as Shadow Minister for International Development. In January 2015, he was awarded the Spirit of Britain award at that year's British Muslim Awards.

In 2012, he was appointed to co-ordinate Scottish Labour's 2014 Scottish independence referendum campaign. The campaign, alongside Better Together, was ultimately successful, with Scotland voting 55% to 45% to remain in the United Kingdom. The leader of Scottish Labour, Johann Lamont, resigned on 25 October 2014, criticising the attitude of the UK-wide Labour Party to the Scottish party and saying that Scottish Labour needed to be more autonomous. The Guardian reported that she felt like she needed to resign after the general secretary of Scottish Labour, Ian Price, was "removed from office without her being consulted". Several Scottish Labour figures echoed her frustrations. Sarwar defended the UK-wide Labour Party, and said that Price "resigned from his position as general secretary and I think we should respect his position". Following the resignation of Johann Lamont on 25 October 2014, Sarwar became acting leader until the new leader, Jim Murphy, was elected. On 30 October, he announced his resignation as deputy leader. At the 2015 general election, he lost his seat to Alison Thewliss of the SNP. Following that election, there was only one Labour MP in Scotland.

Member of the Scottish Parliament 
Sarwar was elected as an additional member in the 2016 Scottish Parliament election for the Glasgow region. In 2016, he was appointed as Scottish Labour's spokesperson for health and sport. Sarwar was opposed to leaving the European Union and said that the UK needed to stay in the single market in order to counter the Conservatives' austerity policies. He sought advice from the police after creating a working group on Islamophobia.

In September 2017, he announced he would run for the Scottish Labour leadership following the resignation of Kezia Dugdale. He was charactarised by opponents as being on the right of the Labour Party and a Blairite, which he repudiated, describing himself as a Brownite. He called the Iraq War "the worst foreign policy decision in my lifetime". He expressed support for UK-wide Labour leader Jeremy Corbyn's policies of "a £10 national living wage, public ownership of the railways, higher taxation for the rich and tougher laws on basic wages and employment rights". He proposed a tax rate of 50p for earnings over £100,000 and cuts to income tax for earnings under £28,000, including a new 15p tax rate for lower earners. His campaign emphasised equality over discussions of independence. He defended sending his children to a private school, saying he and his wife had done what they "thought was best for [their] children". Sarwar was criticised by opponents during after it emerged that his family firm was advertising job vacancies with pay below the recommended living wage. His opponent in the election, Richard Leonard, was on the left wing of the Labour Party. Leonard won the election with 56.7% of the vote. During the 2017 leadership election, Rutherglen councillor Davie McLachlan allegedly said "Scotland wouldn't vote for a brown Muslim Paki". In April 2019, Sarwar's case against McLachlan was due to be heard by the National Constitutional Committee but was dropped on a technicality, as Sarwar had not given his case within the required timescale. Leonard acknowledged the process was flawed and the committee would need to be reformed to avoid similar incidents.

Sarwar was replaced as health and sport spokesperson by Monica Lennon in October 2018. He said he had only learnt of the sacking on the social media platform Twitter. In November 2019, Sarwar was given access to a leaked report from 2015 which had considered infection controls at Queen Elizabeth University Hospital to be at "high risk". 10-year-old patient Milly Main died in the hospital in 2017 from a water infection, while she was there to recover from leukaemia. Sarwar raised the leaked report's findings in a Scottish Parliament debate in which he criticised NHS Greater Glasgow and Clyde for not closing certain hospital wards despite the report's findings. He requested on behalf on Main's mother, a constituent of his, a response from the first minister Nicola Sturgeon. In November 2020, Sarwar was appointed as Scottish Labour's spokesperson for the constitution.

Leader of the Scottish Labour Party 
Following the resignation of Richard Leonard in 2021, Sarwar was elected as leader of the Scottish Labour Party, winning 57.6% of the vote to Monica Lennon's 42.4%. The Guardian described him as a centrist. Despite having criticised Corbyn in the past, Sarwar insisted that his economic plans would be "even more progressive and radical" than those of Corbyn and the former shadow chancellor John McDonnell. Sarwar and some reporters said this made him the first ethnic minority person to lead a major UK political party, although The Spectator pointed to political leaders of Jewish descent such as Benjamin Disraeli, Michael Howard and Ed Miliband while acknowledging he was the first Muslim and person of Asian descent. The leader of the Scottish Conservatives, Douglas Ross, proposed a coalition of parties supporting Scotland remaining in the United Kingdom, which Sarwar rejected. Sarwar called the United Kingdom "fundamentally broken", and said that there should be more devolution of power from Westminster to Holyrood, and from Holyrood to communities. He also confirmed Scottish Labour's opposition to renewing the Trident nuclear programme.

As the leader of Scottish Labour in the run-up to the 2021 Scottish Parliament election, Sarwar pledged to reduce poverty and inequality in Scotland as part of his policy solutions to the aftermath of COVID-19 crisis. In the run-up to the election, the Labour Party removed Hollie Cameron, a Labour candidate who said in an interview that Labour would support a second referendum on Scottish independence depending on timing, contrary to the party's policy. Sarwar was criticised for the decision by figures on the left of the Labour Party.

Sarwar himself ran as a both a list candidate and as constituency candidate for Glasgow Southside, which the first minister Nicola Sturgeon represented. The election saw the worst result for Scottish Labour since devolution, with two fewer Labour MSPs returned than at the previous election. Although he was defeated by the incumbent first minister Nicola Sturgeon in Glasgow Southside, he was re-elected as a list MSP.

In January 2022, it was reported that the UK-wide Labour leader Keir Starmer was interested in allowing more supporters of independence to stand as Labour candidates. Sarwar said that candidates would need to stand on a platform of Scotland remaining in the UK, and that "when it comes to Scottish Labour, I’m in charge". In March 2022, Sarwar announced a policy of providing free residential care and free home care, alongside increasing care workers' wages to a minimum of £15 an hour. Sarwar supports replacing the House of Lords with an elected senate that would represent nations and regions. In November 2022, Declassified UK revealed that Sarwar was a member of the lobbying group British-American Project. In the same month, in an interview with The Times, he talked about the need for growth in order to deliver policies that improve equality and reduce poverty.

Personal life
Sarwar is married to Furheen Sarwar, who works as an NHS dentist. The couple has three young children. He is a Muslim. He owns a quarter share of his family's cash-and-carry wholesale business; his share was valued in 2016 as worth between £2.7 million and £4.8 million. In September 2017, Sarwar transferred his shareholding to a discretionary trust for the benefit of his three young children, so that he could not personally access the assets or dividends.

He is the president of the Sarwar Foundation, and is teetotal.

See also
 List of British Pakistanis

References

External links 

 
 
 
 Video interview after winning his seat in 2010  at Catch21
Son could replace retiring MP Sarwar, The Herald, 23 June 2007
 Election shows politics runs in the family, The Herald, 1 May 2007

|-

|-

1983 births
Living people
Alumni of the University of Glasgow
British politicians of Pakistani descent
Labour MSPs
Members of the Parliament of the United Kingdom for Glasgow constituencies
Members of the Scottish Parliament 2016–2021
Members of the Scottish Parliament 2021–2026
People educated at Hutchesons' Grammar School
Scottish Labour MPs
Scottish Muslims
Scottish people of Pakistani descent
Scottish people of Punjabi descent
UK MPs 2010–2015